Anton Buteyko (6 April 1947, in Staryi Chortoryisk, Ukraine – 10 March 2019, in Kyiv) was a Ukrainian diplomat. Ambassador Extraordinary and Plenipotentiary of Ukraine to the United States (1998-1999). Ambassador Extraordinary and Plenipotentiary of Ukraine to Romania (2000-2003). People's Deputy of Ukraine (1994-1998).

Education 
Anton Buteyko graduated from Taras Shevchenko National University of Kyiv in 1974.

Career 
1974—1976 — attache, 1976—1977 — Third Secretary, 1977—1978 — Second Secretary of the Department of International Organizations

1978—1980 — First Secretary of the General Secretariat of the Ministry of Foreign Affairs.

1980—1986 — member of the Secretariat of the United Nations, New York City.

1986—1990 — adviser to international organizations

1990—1991 — head contractual and legal department of Ministry of Foreign Affairs of the Ukrainian SSR.

1991 — Chairman of a special international commission to create the International Tribunal for the Law of the Sea.

12.1991 — 09.1994 — Advisor to the President of Ukraine, Ukraine Managing Office of International Affairs.

10.1995—11.1998 — First Deputy Minister of Foreign Affairs of Ukraine.

11.1998—12.1999 — Ambassador Extraordinary and Plenipotentiary of Ukraine to the United States.

02.2000 — Ambassador at Large MFA of Ukraine.

2000—2003 — Ambassador Extraordinary and Plenipotentiary of Ukraine to Romania.

12.12.2003 — Vice President of the Association of Ukrainian banks.

2005 — First Deputy Minister of Foreign Affairs of Ukraine.

March 10, 2019 - Died.

References

External links
 Anton Denisovich BUTEYKO
 First Deputy Foreign Minister Anton Buteyko participates in international conference "TransAtlantic Cooperation in Security and Defense Sector" in Budapest
 NATO's Security Discourse After the Cold War: Representing the West. Routledge, 2013 - 230.
 Ukraine's Foreign and Security Policy 1991-2000, Routledge, 29.08.2003р. - 232.


1947 births
2019 deaths
People from Volyn Oblast
Ambassadors of Ukraine to the United States
Ambassadors of Ukraine to Romania
Independent politicians in Ukraine
Second convocation members of the Verkhovna Rada